Radovan  is a village in Croatia.

References

Populated places in Varaždin County

fr:Radovan
hr:Radovan
hu:Radovan
sl:Radovan